Castelvisconti is a comune (municipality) in the Province of Cremona in the Italian region Lombardy, located about  southeast of Milan and about  northwest of Cremona.

Castelvisconti borders the following municipalities: Azzanello, Bordolano, Borgo San Giacomo, Casalbuttano ed Uniti, Casalmorano, Quinzano d'Oglio.

References

Cities and towns in Lombardy